Duncanson may refer to:

 Dewar–Chatt–Duncanson model, organometallic chemistry
 Duncanson (surname), people
 Duncanson-Cranch House, registered historic place in the District of Columbia